Khushhal Khan is a Pakistani television actor and model. Khan is the recipient of Hum Style Award. He made his acting debut with a web series called Midsummer Chaos and later he appeared in television serials such as Qissa Meherbano Ka and Bebasi.

He belongs to a Pakhtun family from Nowshera, and lives in Islamabad.

Television

Telefilm

Web series

Awards and nominations

References 

21st-century Pakistani male actors
Pakistani male models
Living people
Year of birth missing (living people)